Kickapoo Township is a township in Leavenworth County, Kansas, in the United States.

History
It was named after the Kickapoo people.

References

Townships in Leavenworth County, Kansas